The Order of the Golden Stole or Stola d'Oro was an adjunct order of the Order of Saint Mark, in the Republic of Venice. It had a single class, that of knight. Its members were those members of the Order of Saint Mark who were of patrician rank, and wore a golden, flower-embroidered mantle (the eponymous ) as a token of this.

References

Sources
 

Orders, decorations, and medals of Italian states
Republic of Venice